Adela Stanton Coit (also known as Fanny Adela Coit and Adela Wetzlar, née von Gans, September 11, 1863 – October 7, 1932) was a women's suffragist and social reformer. She was a large proponent of the Ethical Movement, which was a movement that focused on providing humanism, or living "rich and moral lives without reference to religious doctrines or supernatural beliefs."

Personal life 

Adela Coit was born in Frankfurt-am-Main, Germany, the daughter of Augusta von Gans (née Ettling) and German industrialist Fredrich Ludwig. She had two brothers, Paul Frederick von Gans and Ludwig Wilhelm von Gans. Coit was married to the writer and philanthropist Stanton Coit on December 21 of 1898. She had also been married to Moritz Benedikt Julius Wetzlar. She had a son, Richard Wetzlar, and three daughters, Elizabeth Wetzlar; Margaret Wetzlar and Virginia Flemming. She lived in London.

Coit had a son, Richard Wetzlar, and three daughters — Elizabeth Wetzlar, Virginia Coit, and Margaret Wetzlar Coit. Margaret Wetzlar Coit was also involved in the women's suffrage movement.

Adela Coit died on October 7, 1932 at Birling Gap.

Career 
Coit was a women's suffragist and the only woman elected to the Royal Institution in 1898. She joined the International Women's Suffrage Alliance in Berlin from its beginning in 1904, becoming its treasurer in 1907. She joined the Women's Social and Political Union in 1907, later moving to become a member of the Women's Tax Resistance League. In 1911 she held a meeting for the Women's Tax Resistance League, going on to become a member of the first Election Fighting Fund Committee of the National Union of Women's Suffrage Societies. From 1913 she was also a member of the executive committee of the London Society for Women's Suffrage.

References 

1863 births
1932 deaths
German suffragists
German feminists
Feminism in the United Kingdom
German humanists
Ethical movement